Saud Anwar (born October 5, 1967) is an American physician and politician, who serves as a member of the Connecticut State Senate, representing the 3rd District. The district includes the towns of East Hartford, South Windsor, East Windsor, and Ellington. A member of the Democratic Party, Anwar was previously the mayor of South Windsor, Connecticut from 2013 to 2015, as well as 2017 to 2019. A pulmonary physician by profession, he is a graduate of Yale University and Aga Khan University. He has two children.

Electoral history

References 

Aga Khan University alumni
Democratic Party Connecticut state senators
Asian-American people in Connecticut politics
21st-century American politicians
Living people
American physicians of Pakistani descent
American pulmonologists
American politicians of Pakistani descent
Pakistani emigrants to the United States
Pakistani pulmonologists
Yale University alumni
1967 births